Augustus Peters (born 27 May 1931 in Aachen) was a German clergyman and bishop for the Roman Catholic Diocese of Aachen. He became ordained in 1958. He was appointed bishop in 1991. He died in 1986.

References

20th-century German Roman Catholic bishops
1931 births
1986 deaths
People from Aachen
20th-century German Roman Catholic priests